Ethics of nanotechnology is the study of the ethical issues emerging from advances in nanotechnology and its impacts.

According to Andrew Chen, ethical concerns about nanotechnologies should include the possibility of their military applications, the dangers posed by self-replicant nanomachines, and their use for surveillance monitoring and tracking. Risks to environment to public health are treated in a report from the Dutch National Institute for Public Health and the Environment as well as is a report of the European Environment Agency. Academic works on ethics of nanotechnology can be found in the journal Nanoethics.

Guidelines
According to the Markkula Center for Applied Ethics possible guidelines for an Ethics of nanotechnology could include:

Nanomachines should only be specialized, not for general purpose
Nanomachines should not be self replicating
Nanomachines should not be made to use an abundant natural compound as fuel
Nanomachines should be tagged so that they can be tracked

Concerns
Ethical concern about nanotechnology include the opposition to their use to fabricate Lethal autonomous weapon, and the fear that they may self replicate ad infinitum in a so-called gray goo scenario, first imagined by K. Eric Drexler. For the EEA  the challenge posed by nano-materials are due to their properties of being novel, biopersistent, readily dispersed, and bioaccumulative; by analogy, thousands cases of mesothelioma were caused by the inhalation of asbestos dust. See nanotoxicology. Nanotechnology belongs to the class of emerging technology known as GRIN: geno-, robo-, info- nano-technologies. 
Another common acronym is NBIC (Nanotechnology, Biotechnology, Information Technology, and Cognitive Science). These technologies are hoped - or feared, depending on the viewpoint, to be leading to improving human bodies and functionalities, see transhumanism.

Further reading

 European Environment Agency, 2013, Late lessons from early warning II Chapter 22 - Nanotechnology - early lessons from early warnings. See also Steffen et al., 2008.
 Jaco Westra (editor), 2014, Assessing health and environmental risks of nanoparticles. An overview, RIVM Rapport.
 Rene von Schomberg (2011), Introduction: Towards Responsible Research and Innovation in the Information and Communication Technologies and Security Technologies Fields.
 R. Feynman, Cargo Cult Science, Commencement Speech at Caltech 1974. (also available in the book: Surely You're Joking, Mr. Feynman!). 
 European Commission, 2009, Commission recommendation on A code of conduct for responsible nanosciences and nanotechnologies research & Council conclusions on Responsible nanosciences and nanotechnologies research.
 C. Marris, Final Report of the PABE research project, 2001.
 E.A.J. Bleeker, S. Evertz, R.E. Geertsma, W.J.G.M. Peijnenburg, J. Westra, S.W.P. Wijnhoven, Assessing health & environmental risks of nanoparticles Current state of affairs in policy, science and areas of application, RIVM Report.
 Roger Strand, 2011, Nano Ethics, In: Nanotechnology in the Agri‐Food Sector: Implications for the Future.
 R. Feynman, There's Plenty of Room at the Bottom lecture given at the annual American Physical Society meeting at Caltech on December 29, 1959.
 Job Timmermans; Zhao Yinghuan; and Jeroen van den Hoven, 2011. Ethics and nanopharmacy: Value sensitive design of new drugs. Nanoethics 5(3): 269-283.
 Steven Umbrello and Seth D. Baum, 2018. Evaluating future nanotechnology: The net societal impacts of atomically precise manufacturing. Futures 100(June): 63-73.
 K. Eric Drexler, 2013. Radical abundance: How a revolution in nanotechnology will change civilization. Public Affairs: New York.

See also
Nanotechnology
Impact of nanotechnology
Molecular Manufacturing
Atomically Precise Manufacturing
Nanotoxicity
Nanomaterials
Nanoparticles

References 

Emerging technologies